The Federal Minister of the Interior is the head of the Federal Ministry of the Interior and a member of the Cabinet of Germany.

The current Federal Minister of the Interior is Nancy Faeser, since 8 December 2021.

List of officeholders

Secretaries of State for the Interior, 1879–1919
Political Party:

Ministers of the Interior, 1919–1945
Political Party:

Ministers of the Interior of the GDR, 1949–1990
Political Party:

Ministers of the Interior (Bundesminister des Innern), since 1949
Political Party:

References

External links
 bmi.bund.de

Interior